Charles Chandler is the name of:

 Charles Chandler, an extra on the set of The Captive (1915) who was killed in an onset shooting.
 Charles Chandler (cricketer) (1870–1940), Jamaican cricketer
 Charles Chandler (rower) (1911–1982), American rower and Olympic gold medalist
 Charles F. Chandler (1836–1925), American chemist and public-health reformer
 Charles deForest Chandler (1878–1939), American military aviator
 Charles Chandler (comics), a Marvel Comics character